Risocaine (or propyl 4-aminobenzoate) is a local anesthetic.

Abandoned drugs
Propyl esters